Hajji Malang Kharut (also Romanized as Ḩājjī Malang Kharūţ) is a village in Jahanabad Rural District, in the Central District of Hirmand County, Sistan and Baluchestan Province, Iran. At the 2006 census, its population was 535, in 103 families.

References 

Populated places in Hirmand County